Virginia Tanzmann is an American architect. She was inducted into the American Institute of Architects College of Fellows in 1992.

Education 
She received her Bachelor of Architecture from Syracuse University in 1969.

Career 
In 1978, Tanzmann founded Tanzmann Associates. She is currently the Vice President of WSP | Parsons Brinckerhoff.

Positions 
From 1987 to 1988, Tanzmann served as President of the Association of Women in Architecture (AWA).

Significant buildings 
 North Hollywood station, 2000.
 Los Angeles Mission, 303 East 5th Street, Los Angeles, CA 90013 
 Anaheim Regional Transportation Intermodal Center (ARTIC), 2014
 Kaleidoscope Dreams (part of North Hollywood station), 2000

See also
Elsa Leviseur

References

Additional References 

 Virginia Tanzmann ’68, G’69 | Los Angeles (syr.edu)
 Virginia Tanzmann | 211LA
 Kaleidoscope Dreams – Art (metro.net)

External links
 Member Spotlight: Virginia Tanzmann, FAIA 

Architects from New York City
Living people
Women architects
Year of birth missing (living people)